Spice World – 2019 Tour was the fourth concert tour by English girl-group the Spice Girls. It was the group's first tour as a four-piece without Victoria Beckham, and included performances in the United Kingdom and Ireland. Spice World commenced on 24 May 2019 at Croke Park in Dublin, Ireland, and ended on 15 June 2019 at Wembley Stadium in London, England. Across the 13 sold-out dates, the tour produced 700,000 spectators and earned $78.2 million in ticket sales.

The three-night sellout stand at Wembley Stadium was the highest-grossing engagement of the year, winning the 2019 Billboard Live Music Award for Top Boxscore.

Background 
Spice World was the fourth concert tour by the Spice Girls, and marked the group's first performance together since the 2012 Summer Olympics closing ceremony. It was also the group's first tour without Victoria Beckham, who declined to take part due to other commitments.

On 10 November 2018 several ticket-selling websites, such as Ticketmaster and See Tickets, crashed due to the overwhelming volume of people attempting to buy tickets. Ticketmaster later stated that at one point, over 700,000 fans were simultaneously attempting to purchase tickets, making it their busiest sale ever. The six original dates sold out within minutes, prompting the group to add additional dates in Manchester and London. More dates were soon announced to take place in Coventry and Cardiff due to further demand. On 16 November, a show in Dublin's Croke Park was announced, the band’s first in Ireland in 21 years. Consequently, the tour was renamed to Spice World – 2019 Tour.

Accolades 
The three-night sellout stand at Wembley Stadium was the highest-grossing engagement of the year, winning the 2019 Billboard Live Music Award for Top Boxscore.

Set list 
This set list is representative of the 24 May 2019 show in Croke Park, Dublin. It may not represent all dates of the tour.

 "Spice Up Your Life" 
 "If U Can't Dance"
 "Who Do You Think You Are" 
 "Do It"
 "Something Kinda Funny"
 "Move Over" (interlude)
 "Holler"
 "Viva Forever"
 "Let Love Lead the Way"
 "Goodbye"
 "Never Give Up on the Good Times"
 "We Are Family"
 "Love Thing"
 "The Lady Is a Vamp"
 "Too Much"
 "Say You'll Be There"
 "2 Become 1"
 "Stop"
 "Mama"
 "Wannabe"

Tour dates

Personnel 

Vocals
 Mel B
 Emma Bunton
 Geri Horner
 Melanie C

Band
Ricci Riccardi – Musical Director, drums
Louis Riccardi – Guitars
Dave Troke – Bass guitar
Ayo "Ayce" Oyerinde – Keyboards
Karlos Edwards – Percussion

Creative team
Lee Lodge – Creative Director
Jason Sherwood – Set Designer
Paul Roberts – Choreographer and Stage Director
Tim Routledge – Lighting Director
Aries Moross – Art Director
Gabriella Slade – Costume Designer

Production crew
Tony Gittens – Production Manager
David Odlum – Music Producer

Dancers

House of Scary
Jo Dyce (Dance Captain)
Shay Barclay
Billy Sawyer
Kane Horn
Robyn Laud

House of Baby
James Mulford
Josh Huerta
Michael Naylor
Channelle George
Maya King

House of Ginger
Jake Leigh
Kieran Daley-Ward
Che Jones
Dani Hampson
Demi Rox

House of Sporty
Mason Boyce
Oli Metzler
Mike Fellows
Erin Dusek
Majella Fitzgerald

References 

2019 concert tours
Concert tours of Ireland
Concert tours of the United Kingdom
Reunion concert tours
Spice Girls concert tours